C Cube may refer to:

C-Cube, a semiconductor company
C³, a Japanese light novel series
C Cube, a concept in Artemis Fowl